Liban Soleman is an expert in political and economic development matters in Africa. After a brief time in the private sector as a business developer in Israel and in the United States, Soleman moved to the public sector in Africa and quickly held key positions within the government of Gabon before his 30s. Initiating, implementing and managing large scale strategic and multi-discipline government projects at national and International levels, he gained intimate knowledge of the Sub Saharan African environment, on development issues on the continent and the general business cultures. He has successfully participated in the coordination and development of clusters, value networks and business ecosystems, and parallel in building institutions, and identifying and developing human resources to further implement and regulate these key programs. During this period, he was also personally involved in various initiatives to help local communities, youth entrepreneurship.

Soleman is major cultural passionate and promoter. This as an adept advocate of the importance of developing the black excellence and afro-positive narratives, and culture shapes them. From this vantage point, development progress depends on changing not only incentives but also mindsets.

After almost 10 years of this unique experience, he is now back to the private sector, initiating and assisting investment projects ranging from infrastructure , public private partnerships to new technologies all to develop African economies and facilitate access to services for the populations in several sectors. His comprehensive knowledge of international trends, the African environment, business and economies is a major asset for the Tomorrow Foundation, helping the Foundation to better target its actions and develop valuable partnerships.

References 

Living people
Year of birth missing (living people)
Place of birth missing (living people)
Nationality missing